Typhoon Tess was a typhoon that caused great damage to Japan (especially the Kinki region) in September 1953 while Japan is still in the middle of post-war recovery. The name 'Typhoon Tess' has been attributed to eleven other tropical cyclones.

Meteorological history 
On September 16, a weak tropical cyclone was formed in the eastern Caroline Islands. It remained relatively weak until around the September 21, but on the 22nd it strengthened rapidly. Such a sudden increase in power is extremely rare. This pressure drop corresponds to the largest of Pacific typhoons since 1951. Tess finally crossed the Shima Peninsula and made landfall to Aichi Prefecture on the September 25.

Impact 
The number of people killed by Tess was 393, while 85 were missing. Japan suffered some large-scale disasters with more than 1,000 of casualties. When compared to the June 1953 North Kyushu flood and Wakayama flood, the damage caused by Typhoon Tess was relatively mild but still destructive, with 86,398 houses are destroyed, 495,875 flooded houses, 318,657 hectares of damaged agricultural fields and 5,582 damaged ships.

The Coast Act 
Storm surge damages caused by a large number of typhoons were interfering with Japan's post-war recovery, especially Typhoon Tess of 1953. The  history  of  Japan's modern typhoon-induced coastal  disaster prevention works began with Typhoon Tess and led to the enactment of the Coast Act in 1956.

References

See also 

 1953 Pacific typhoon season

1953 Pacific typhoon season
Typhoons in Japan
1953 in Japan